Mortola may refer to:
 Mortola (arachnid), a genus of arachnids
 Mortola Inferiore, a frazione of the comune of Ventimiglia, in Liguria, Italy; also known as La Mortola
 Mortola Superiore, a frazione of the comune of Ventimiglia, in Liguria, Italy
 Mortola, a character in the Inkworld trilogy by Cornelia Funke